The 2010–11 A Group was the 87th season of the Bulgarian national top football division, and the 63rd of A Group as the top-tier football league in the country. The season commenced on 31 July 2010 and ended with the last games on 28 May 2011. The winter break was between the weekends around 29 November 2010 and 26 February 2011. Litex Lovech had defended their 2009/10 A Group title and became champions for 2 years in a row.

Team information
Lokomotiv Mezdra, Sportist Svoge and Botev Plovdiv were directly relegated after finishing in the bottom three places. Lokomotiv ended a two-year tenure, Sportist were relegated after a year in A Group and Botev were excluded from A Group due to financial difficulties at the winter brake.

The relegated teams were replaced by Vidima-Rakovski, champions of West B Group and Kaliakra Kavarna, champions of the East B Group. Vidima-Rakovski returned to A Group after two years, while Kaliakra entered the top division for their first time.

A further place in the league was decided by a play-off match between the runners-up teams from the two B Group's. The game was played on 23 May 2010 between Nesebar and Akademik Sofia. Akademik won the match by 2–1 and returned to the top division after 28 years. The last season the club had played in A Group was 1981–82.

Stadia and locations
As in the previous year, the league will comprise the best thirteen teams of season 2009/10, the 2 champions of the West and East B Group's and the winners of the promotion play-off between the runners-up from the West and East B Group's.

The following teams have ensured their participation in A Group for season 2010/11 (listed in alphabetical order):

Notes
 Akademik Sofia will play their league home games at Ovcha Kupel Stadium in Sofia because their Akademik Stadium had not received approval from the BFU license committee.
 CSKA Sofia will play their league home games at Vasil Levski National Stadium in Sofia because their Balgarska Armiya had not received approval from the BFU license committee.
 Lokomotiv Sofia will play their league home games at Vasil Levski National Stadium in Sofia because their Lokomotiv Stadium had not received approval from the BFU license committee.

Personnel and sponsoring

Managerial changes

League table

Results

Positions by round

Relegation playoff 

Chernomorets Pomorie wasn't allowed to compete in the next season, so there will be 2 play-offs. The first will be between the teams that lost against Chernomorets Pomorie, Vidima-Rakovski and Sportist Svoge. The other will be between Svetkavitsa and FC Etar Veliko Tarnovo (the 3rd teams in the West and East B Group) for the Pirin Blagoevgrad's place.

Champions
Litex Lovech

Niflore, Popov and Bratu left the club during a season.

Season statistics

Top goalscorers
Including matches played on 28 May 2011

Top assistants
Including matches played on 28 May 2011

Scoring

First goal of the season: 18:06, 31 July 2010 –  Georgi Filipov for Kaliakra against Slavia (6th minute)
Fastest goal in a match: 19 seconds –  Rumen Trifonov for CSKA against Chernomorets (8 August 2010)
First own goal of the season:  Yordan Petkov (Slavia) for Beroe, 3rd round (15 August 2010)
First hat-trick of the season:  Garra Dembélé (Levski) against Loko Sofia (9 August 2010)
 Quickest hat-trick: 25 minutes –  Garra Dembélé (Levski) against Minyor (12 September 2010)
Widest winning margin: 5 goals
Sliven 2000 6–1 Vidima-Rakovski (18 September 2010)
Lokomotiv Plovdiv 5–0 Kaliakra (25 September 2010)
Cherno More 5–0 Vidima-Rakovski (9 April 2011)
Most goals in one half: 6 goals
Sliven 2000 6–1 Vidima-Rakovski (5–1 at half time) (18 September 2010)
Most goals scored by losing team: 3 goals
Lokomotiv Sofia 4–3 Slavia (27 November 2010)
 Highest scoring draw: 4 goals
Vidima-Rakovski 2–2 CSKA (14 August 2010)
Lokomotiv Plovdiv 2–2 Litex (22 August 2010)
Montana 2–2 Akademik (18 September 2010)
Minyor 2–2 Lokomotiv Plovdiv (2 October 2010)
Lokomotiv Sofia 2–2 CSKA (4 October 2010)
Slavia 2–2 Levski (7 November 2010)

Discipline

 First yellow card of the season:  Radoslav Mitrevski for Pirin against Cherno More, 17 minutes and 25 seconds (31 July 2010)
 First red card of the season:  Anton Dimitrov for Kaliakra against Slavia, 87 minutes and 14 seconds (31 July 2010)
 Most yellow cards in a single match: 10
 Akademik 0–1 Sliven – 6 for Akademik (Pieter Mbemba, Asparuh Vasilev, Ivan Redovski, Nikola Asenov, Marcos Bonfim and Yulian Petkov) and 4 for Sliven (Petar Stoyanov, Nikolay Dimitrov, Miroslav Mindev and Dimo Bakalov) (21 August 2010)
 Most red cards in a single match: 3
 Cherno More 3–2 Slavia – 1 for Cherno More (Ademar Júnior) and 2 for Slavia (Galin Ivanov, Victor Deniran) (17 October 2010)

See also
List of Bulgarian football transfers summer 2010
List of Bulgarian football transfers winter 2010–11

References

External links
Official website

First Professional Football League (Bulgaria) seasons
1
Bul